Richard Wackar (February 24, 1928 – August 15, 2016) was an American football and basketball coach.  He served as the head football coach at Glassboro State College (now called Rowan University), an NCAA Division III program in Glassboro, New Jersey. He was the third all-time coach for the Profs and compiled a 65–84–4 record in 17 seasons. Wackar's most notable accomplishment is being recognized as the only coach in NJAC history to win conference championships in four sports (football, basketball, golf, and cross country).

Rowan University renamed their football stadium to Coach Richard Wackar Stadium at John Page Field.

Head coaching record

Football

References

1928 births
2016 deaths
Basketball coaches from New Jersey
College golf coaches in the United States
People from Pitman, New Jersey
Rowan Profs football coaches
Rowan Profs men's basketball coaches
Rowan University faculty
Rutgers Scarlet Knights football players
Sportspeople from Gloucester County, New Jersey